Igor Alexandrovich Antropenko (born on 12 December 1969 in Omsk, Russian Soviet Federative Socialist Republic) is a Russian political figure, deputy of the 8th State Duma convocation. 

In 1993 he graduated from the faculty of law of the Omsk State University. Later he continued his education at the Russian Presidential Academy of National Economy and Public Administration and Moscow Power Engineering Institute. In 2004 he was awarded a Candidate of Legal Sciences degree from the Omsk Academy of the Ministry of Internal Affairs. From 2012 to 2016, he served as a deputy in the Omsk City Council, running with a party A Just Russia — For Truth. Since 2013, he had been a part of the Board of Directors of the Omsk Electromechanical Plant. He participated twice (2017, 2021) in the Omsk mayor elections, but both times unsuccessfully. 

Since September 2021, he has represented Omsk in the State Duma of 8th convocation. He ran with the United Russia.

Igor Antropenko is married and has two children.

He is one of the members of the State Duma the United States Treasury sanctioned on 24 March 2022 in response to the 2022 Russian invasion of Ukraine.

References

1969 births
Living people
Politicians from Omsk
United Russia politicians
21st-century Russian politicians
Eighth convocation members of the State Duma (Russian Federation)
Russian individuals subject to the U.S. Department of the Treasury sanctions